Ab Garmak (also Romanized as Āb Garmak; also known as Ābgarmak-e Pā’īn) is a village in Saroleh Rural District, Meydavud District, Bagh-e Malek County, Khuzestan Province, Iran. In 2006, its population was 189, in 36 families.

References 

Populated places in Bagh-e Malek County